Ravi Shastri is a 2006 Indian Kannada-language romantic comedy film directed by M. S. Rajashekar and M. R. Raghavendra. It is a remake of the Tamil film Idhu Namma Aalu (1988) and stars Ravichandran and Sneha, in her Kannada cinema debut.

Plot

Cast 
Ravichandran as Ravi Shastri
Sneha as Bhanu
Ananth Nag as Narayana Dixit
Umashree
Doddanna
Karibasavaiah
Vinaya Prasad
Mandya Ramesh
Bank Janardhan

Production 
The film was initially titled Brahmana. The film completed shooting by mid-2006.

Soundtrack 
Cricketer Ravi Shastri, who shared his name for this film, was to come for the audio launch but did not show up because he was not paid .

Reception 
R. G. Vijayasarathy of Rediff.com opined that "Ravi Shashtry has a strong message to convey, but it unfortunately ends up being an ordinary film". A critic from Sify wrote that "This remake of K.Bhagyaraj classic Idhu Namma Aal from Tamil lacks the Kannada milieu and flavour. Director M.S.Rajashekhar could have made the film more racy and entertaining, which would have appealed to the masses".

References

External links 
 

2000s Kannada-language films
2006 romantic comedy films
Indian romantic comedy films
Kannada remakes of Tamil films